Katchoo may refer to:

 Katina "Katchoo" Choovanski, a character in the comic book Strangers in Paradise
 "Katchoo", a 1969 episode of The Brady Bunch

See also
 Katchou (1963–2009), Algerian singer